The 11th Screen Actors Guild Awards, honoring the best achievements in film and television performances for the year 2004, took place on February 5, 2005. The ceremony, for the 9th consecutive time was held at the Shrine Exposition Center in Los Angeles, California, and was televised live by TNT.

The nominees were announced on January 11, 2005 by Rosario Dawson and James Denton at Los Angeles' Pacific Design Center's Silver Screen Theater. The ceremony is notable for a rare feat attained by Jamie Foxx, who was nominated in four categories, making him the first actor to receive this amount of nominations in the same year.

Winners and nominees
Winners are listed first and highlighted in boldface.

Screen Actors Guild Life Achievement Award 
 James Garner

Film

Television

In Memoriam 
Laura Linney introduced this segment remembering the members of the guild who died in 2004:

 Ronald Reagan
 Alan King
 Carrie Snodgress
 John Randolph
 Julius Harris
 Fay Wray
 John Drew Barrymore
 Virginia Mayo
 Rodney Dangerfield
 Warren J. Kemmerling
 Virginia Capers
 Frank Maxwell
 Robert Pastorelli
 Ossie Davis
 Ron O'Neal
 Ruth Warrick
 Iggie Wolfington
 Richard Biggs
 Eugene Roche
 Virginia Grey
 Paul Winfield
 Mercedes McCambridge
 Joe Viterelli
 Isabel Sanford
 Tony Randall
 Jerry Orbach
 Peter Ustinov
 Jan Sterling
 Howard Keel
 Janet Leigh
 Ray Charles
 Marlon Brando
 Christopher Reeve
 Johnny Carson

References

External links 
 The 11th Annual Screen Actors Guild Awards
 About.com

2004
2004 film awards
2004 guild awards
2004 television awards
Screen
Screen Actors Guild
Screen
February 2005 events in the United States